Danilo Tartabull Mora (born October 30, 1962) is a Cuban–Puerto Rican former professional baseball right fielder and designated hitter. He played 14 seasons in Major League Baseball (MLB) for the Seattle Mariners (1984–1986), Kansas City Royals (1987–1991), New York Yankees (1992–1995), Oakland Athletics (1995), Chicago White Sox (1996), and Philadelphia Phillies (1997).

Early life
Tartabull was born on October 30, 1962, in San Juan, Puerto Rico, the son of Cuban parents. His father, José Tartabull, played in Major League Baseball from 1962 to 1970. Tartabull attended Miami Carol City Senior High School in Miami Gardens, Florida where he played baseball and basketball. As a senior, he was an all-state second baseman. He was drafted by the Cincinnati Reds in the third round of the 1980 Major League Baseball draft.

Playing career
Tartabull played for the Seattle Mariners (1984–86), Kansas City Royals (1987–91), New York Yankees (1992–95), Oakland Athletics (1995), Chicago White Sox (1996), and Philadelphia Phillies (1997). Originally a shortstop, Tartabull broke into the majors for good in 1986 with the Mariners, who moved him to right field after briefly experimenting with him at second base. He responded by hitting .270 with 25 home runs and 96 runs batted in, but his rookie season was overshadowed by those of Wally Joyner and José Canseco. The Mariners traded him to Kansas City for prospects Scott Bankhead, Mike Kingery, and Steve Shields before the start of the 1987 season, where Tartabull avoided the sophomore jinx, improving to .309/34/101. Although sometimes slowed by injuries, Tartabull had five productive seasons with Kansas City, culminating with an All-Star selection in 1991. That same year, Tartabull led the major leagues in slugging percentage (.593). He became a free agent after the 1991 season and signed a deal with the Yankees worth more than $5 million a year (the deal being the first piece of news on ESPN Radio), but he never again matched his production in Kansas City.

In July 1995 the Yankees traded Tartabull for Rubén Sierra and Jason Beverlin. Following his trade out of New York, Tartabull expressed his disdain for Yankees owner George Steinbrenner, saying that getting out of New York was like having been "released from jail". The Athletics traded him to the White Sox the following winter for Andrew Lorraine and minor leaguer Charles Poe. He had 101 RBI but scored 58 runs, fewer runs than all but one player in history with at least 100 RBI. Tartabull wound down his 14-year career with the Phillies in 1997, appearing in just three games.

Tartabull retired following the 1997 season with a career batting average of .273, 262 home runs, and 925 runs batted in.

Personal life

A warrant was issued for Tartabull's arrest on May 12, 2012 after he failed to appear for a 180-day jail sentence, and is on the Most Wanted List for Los Angeles County Child Services Department. He has been named the top deadbeat dad in Los Angeles after allegedly failing to pay more than $275,000 in child support for his two sons. Tartabull was arrested July 24, 2017 on suspicion of unpaid child support after he called police to report his car was broken into. His son, Quentin, had set him up by breaking into his car. He played football at Cal.

Other media

During the 1994-95 MLB strike, Tartabull and a handful of other striking players appeared as themselves in the November 27, 1994 episode of Married With Children (Season 9, Episode 11.)

Tartabull made a cameo appearance on TV sitcom Seinfeld as himself in the episodes "The Chaperone" and "The Pledge Drive".

See also
 List of Major League Baseball players from Puerto Rico
 List of Major League Baseball career home run leaders
 List of second-generation Major League Baseball players

References

External links

Retrosheet

1962 births
Living people
American League All-Stars
Billings Mustangs players
Calgary Cannons players
Chattanooga Lookouts players
Chicago White Sox players
Kansas City Royals players
Major League Baseball players from Puerto Rico
Major League Baseball right fielders
New York Yankees players
Oakland Athletics players
Pacific Coast League MVP award winners
Philadelphia Phillies players
Puerto Rican expatriate baseball players in Canada
Puerto Rican people of Cuban descent
Salt Lake City Gulls players
Seattle Mariners players
Baseball players from Miami
Tampa Tarpons (1957–1987) players
Waterbury Reds players
Miami Carol City Senior High School alumni